Jacek Bromski (born 19 December 1946) is a Polish film director. He has directed 15 films since 1982. He was a member of the jury at the 18th Moscow International Film Festival.

Selected filmography
 Alice (1982) (co-directed with Jerzy Gruza)
 Love Stories (1997) (co-produced with Juliusz Machulski and Jacek Moczydłowski )
 U Pana Boga za piecem (1998)
 To ja, złodziej (1999)
 Career of Nikos Dyzma (2002)
 U Pana Boga w ogródku (2007)
 U Pana Boga za miedzą (2009)
 A Trip to the Moon (2013)

References

External links

Jacek Bromski at the Polish Internet Movie Database 

1946 births
Living people
Polish film directors
Polish screenwriters
Film people from Wrocław